Coluzea is a genus of sea snails in the family Columbariidae.

Species
, species within the genus Coluzea include:

References

Columbariidae